Güleç (literally "smiling", "cheerful") is a Turkish surname and toponym and may refer to:

List of surname holders 
 Gökhan Güleç (born 1985), Turkish footballer
 Rabia Gülec (born 1994), German taekwondo athlete of Turkish descent
 Sümeyye Güleç (born 1989),  German taekwondo athlete of Turkish descent
 Tahir Güleç (born 1993), German taekwondo athlete of Turkish descent
 Tolga Güleç (born 1981), Turkish actor

Place name 
 Güleç, Anamur, village in Anamur district of Mersin Province, Turkey
 Güleç, Biga, village in Biga district of Çanakkale Province, Turkey
 Güleç, Kulp, village in Kulp district of Diyarbakır Province, Turkey
 Güleç, Mazgirt, village in Mazgirt district of Tunceli Province, Turkey

Turkish-language surnames